Arifa Siddiqui (Urdu ) is a Pakistani actress and singer who worked for PTV in the 1980s and 1990s.

Early life
Arifa was born on 9 June 1969 in Lahore, Pakistan. She is the daughter of actress Talat Siddiqui who worked for Pakistan radio and film industry. Her sister Nahid Siddiqui is a classical dancer and was, at one time, married to another television personality Zia Mohyeddin. Arifa is also a cousin to another noted Pakistani pop and TV singer Fariha Pervez and her aunt Rehana Siddiqui was a film actress.

Career
Arifa started acting and singing at a very young age. She appeared in various TV serials and programs in Pakistan. Her most famous work is in Dehleez (1981), Sona Chandi (1982) (PTV), Samundar (1983), Khawaja and Son (1988) and Ainak Wala Jin (1993). Arifa Siddiqui was a likeable and talented actress whose smile was infectious. She had a reputation for delivering her on-screen dialogue with perfect pronunciation.

Personal life
Arifa first married at age of 26 years with Ustad Nazar Hussain age 56 who was 30 years older than her. He was a music composer and singer at PTV, Lahore, Pakistan who also was her music teacher. This was a love marriage and lasted successfully for 23 years till his death due to lung cancer in January 2018. Arifa had quit the TV industry after her first marriage. After the death of Ustad Nazar Hussain, she married Tabeer Ali who is also a great composer and singer.

Filmography

Television series
 Dehleez (1981) (PTV)
 Sona Chandi (1982) (PTV)
 Samundar (1983) (PTV)
 Status (1984) (PTV)
 Tota Kahani (1985) (PTV)
 Kahani No: 6 (1986) (PTV)
 Saraab (1987) (PTV)
 Band Gali (1988) (PTV)
 Khawaja and Son (1988) (PTV)
 Pyas (1989) (PTV)
 Neelay Hath (1989) (PTV)
 Fishaar (1990) (PTV)
 Wadera Sayeen (1992) (PTV)
 Eshaan (1992) (PTV)
 Yes Sir, No Sir (1993) (PTV)
 Ainak Wala Jin (1993) (PTV)
 Dal Dal (1994) (PTV)
 Manchaly ka Sauda (1994) (PTV) (Written by Ashfaq Ahmed)
 Aapa (1995) (PTV)
 Miraat-ul-Uroos (1996) (PTV)
 Rahain (1997) (PTV)
 Larki Ek Sharmili Si (1998) (PTV)
 Gharib-e-Shehar (1999) (PTV)
 Inkaar (2000) (PTV)
 ShahlaKot (2004) (PTV)

Film

Awards and recognition

References

External links
 

1969 births
20th-century Pakistani actresses
Living people
20th-century Pakistani women singers
Actresses in Pashto cinema
Punjabi people
Actresses in Punjabi cinema
21st-century Pakistani actresses
Actresses in Urdu cinema
21st-century Pakistani women singers
Nigar Award winners
Pakistani film actresses
Punjabi-language singers
Actresses in Sindhi cinema
Urdu-language singers
Pakistani women singers
Pakistani television actresses